The Revolutionary Snake Ensemble is an American instrumental musical group led by Boston, Massachusetts based saxophonist Ken Field. They performs an improvised style inspired by the second line brass bands of New Orleans parades. The group's colorful costumes and creative arrangements have earned it invitations to entertain audiences as large as 20,000

Revolutionary Snake Ensemble performances have included many venues including: the New Orleans Krewe of Muses Mardi Gras Parade, Kennedy Center for the Performing Arts, the  Cambridge River Festival, the HONK! festival, Regattabar, the Central Square World's Fair, the  Somerville Theater, First Night Boston, First Night  Providence, First Night  Fall River, the Boston Museum of Fine Arts, the Brooklyn Academy of Music, the Puffin Cultural Forum, Tipitina's (New Orleans) and the Berklee Performance Center. 

The Ensemble can be heard on Parade of Numbers, an animated counting piece regularly aired on the beloved children's program Sesame Street, since 1995. It was animated by Field's late wife Karen Aqua (1954-2011).

Repeatedly nominated in their Best Music Poll by The Boston Phoenix and WFNX Radio, the Revolutionary Snake Ensemble includes a roster of notable Boston-area musicians.  The group has been twice nominated by a panel of music writers and critics for a Boston Music Award, and was nominated Best Jazz Group in the 2014 New England Music Awards.

Their latest release, Live Snakes (Accurate Records 2014), was recorded in 2011 and 2013 in Boston, Brooklyn, & Manhattan, and documents four distinct incarnations of the ensemble, with two remixes by Field. "Live Snakes" features guest musicians Charles Neville, Josh Roseman, Kenny Wollesen, and Matt Darriau.

Forked Tongue, the group's second CD, was released May 13, 2008 on the Cuneiform label and includes, among other tracks, a brass reinterpretation of Billy Idol's "White Wedding."  The CD was included on best-of-year lists from the Village Voice, Georgia Public Radio, the Postimees (Estonia), KMUW (Wichita), WFNX (Boston), WRUW (Cleveland), AllAboutJazz.com, WUSM (Madison, WI), WNMC (Detroit), and WUSB (Stony Brook, NY).

Year of the Snake was the group's debut CD, and includes interpretations of music by other artists including Field, Sun Ra, John Scofield and James Brown.  Liner notes were contributed by two-time Grammy-winning New Orleans music producer Scott Billington.  The CD was listed as one of the top CDs of the year on New York NPR affiliate WNYC, in the New Orleans Gambit Weekly, and on Radio Popolare in Milan, Italy.

External links
 Revolutionary Snake Ensemble homepage
 Revolutionary Snake Ensemble Facebook page

Cuneiform Records artists
Musical groups from New Orleans
American brass bands